The 2012–13 Arizona Storm season was the second and final season of the Arizona Storm professional indoor soccer club. The Storm, a Southwestern Division team in the Professional Arena Soccer League, played their home games in the Arizona Sports Complex in Glendale, Arizona. The team was led by general manager/assistant coach Steven Green and head coach Rino Green.

Season summary
The Storm had mixed results in the regular season, earning a 6–10 record and third place in the PASL's four-team Southwestern Division, and failed to advance to the postseason. The franchise also struggled at the box office, placing last among the PASL's 19 teams in average home attendance.

The Storm participated in the 2012–13 United States Open Cup for Arena Soccer. They lost to the San Diego Sockers in the Wild Card round, abruptly ending their run in the tournament.

History
The team was originally organized in 2011, playing its 2011-12 season at the 500-seat Phoenix Sports Centre in Phoenix, Arizona.

Schedule

Regular season

† Game also counts for US Open Cup, as listed in chart below.

2012–13 US Open Cup for Arena Soccer

References

External links
azstormfc.com Arizona Storm official website

Arizona Storm
Sports in Glendale, Arizona